True Crime: Streets of LA is a 2003 open world action-adventure video game developed by Luxoflux and published by Activision for GameCube, PlayStation 2 and Xbox in November 2003, for Microsoft Windows in May 2004, and by Aspyr for Mac OS X in March 2005. A mobile phone adaptation was released in November 2004. The game tells the story of Nicholas Kang, an uncompromising LAPD detective who is recruited into the Elite Operations Division in order to investigate a series of bombings in Chinatown. As he delves further into the case, he discovers it may be connected to the disappearance of his police-officer father twenty years previously. The game features a  re-creation of a large part of Los Angeles, including most of Beverly Hills and Santa Monica, with most street names, landmarks and highways reproduced accurately.

Streets of LA received generally mixed-to-positive reviews. Many critics praised the ambitious nature of the game, its setting, the differentiation between itself and Grand Theft Auto III, the branching storyline and the overall 'feel'. Common criticisms, however, were graphical and technical problems, an unlikable protagonist, and poorly implemented gameplay. The game was a commercial success, selling over three million units worldwide across all platforms, and the True Crime franchise continued in 2005, with the release of True Crime: New York City.

Gameplay
True Crime is an open world action-adventure game played from a third-person perspective, in which the player controls Detective Nicholas Kang of the "Elite Operations Division" (E.O.D.), a hand-picked autonomous unit of the regular LAPD.

The game was one of the first non-Grand Theft Auto open world action-adventure games released after Grand Theft Auto III in 2001, and, as such, was labeled by many as a Grand Theft Auto clone, as the core game mechanics are identical to Grand Theft Auto III, and its 2002 successor, Grand Theft Auto: Vice City – the player can travel across the city freely, commandeer vehicles, do whatever they want in terms of attacking and/or killing innocent civilians, and progress through the storyline at their own leisure, spending as much time traversing the city as they wish. However, the major difference from Grand Theft Auto games is that in True Crime, the player controls a law enforcement officer. As such, True Crime has been called "the GTA III clone where you play a cop."

The game involves four main types of mission, each with their own unique gameplay; shooting, fighting, stealth and driving. In many levels of the game, even if missions are failed, the storyline will continue, sometimes with a different opening cutscene for the next level, sometimes with an alternate version of the level, occasionally by branching into an entirely different storyline.

During shooting missions, the game auto-targets the closest opponent. If the player wishes to switch target to another opponent, they must do so manually. When the player is in shooting mode, they can enter "Precision Targeting" at any time. At this point, the game switches to first-person, zooms in on the target, and goes into slow motion momentarily. While in Precision Targeting, if the targeting reticule turns green, the player can hit the enemy with a neutralizing, non-lethal shot. If the player fires when the reticule is red, the enemy will be killed instantly. Players can also take cover during shootouts, firing from behind cover when the opportunity presents itself. Players are also free to pick up any weapons dropped by enemies. Once the ammo of these weapons is depleted, however, Kang will drop the weapon and revert to his standard issue revolver, which, although it does need to be reloaded, never runs out of ammo.

In hand-to-hand combat, the player has four main attacks; high kick, low kick, punch, and grapple. After hitting an enemy a certain number of times, the enemy will be stunned, at which point the player can perform a combo by pressing a series of buttons. During stealth missions, the player is automatically placed into stealth mode. The player can approach enemies from behind and either knock them out or kill them. Bumping into objects or walking over broken glass or plastic bags will cause nearby enemies to become aware of the player's presence.

Driving missions can involve either trying to catch another car, escape from another car or tailing another car. At all times, when the player is in a car, their car's condition is shown on screen. If the car's health meter empties, the car is close to destruction. When another car is involved, that car's health meter will also be shown on-screen. When the player is tailing another car, a "Tail meter" will appear on-screen, with three sections and a moving arrow. If the arrow is in the top section, it means the player is too close and must back off. If the arrow is in the bottom section, it means the player is losing the target and must speed up. As such, the player must try to keep the arrow in the middle section as much as possible. During normal driving missions, the player can solve random crimes given by the radio dispatcher.

The player can access 24/7 facilities throughout the game to upgrade either their driving, fighting or shooting abilities. 24/7 facilities are only accessible if the player has an available "badge." Badges are earned by acquiring "Reward points"; every one-hundred reward points is converted into one badge. Entry into a 24/7 facility costs one badge, and the player must complete a challenge to earn the upgrade. If they fail, they must spend another badge to try again. Rewards points are also necessary for the player to heal themselves at a pharmacy or have their car repaired at a garage; the number of points deducted depends on the level of damage in each case. The player earns reward points for arresting or killing criminals, solving crimes and completing missions. Points are deducted for killing civilians and failing missions.

The player also has a "Good Cop/Bad Cop" meter. If the player arrests criminals, solves crimes, shoots opponents with neutralizing shots, and knocks out rather than kills opponents in stealth missions, they will get Good Cop points. If, however, they kill civilians, shoot criminals in the head, use weapons in hand-to-hand combat, or kill enemies in stealth missions, they will get Bad Cop points. At certain points in the game, the storyline will branch differently depending on whether the player has a Good Cop score or a Bad Cop score. If the player's Bad Cop score gets too high, civilians will begin to attack Kang. If the Bad Cop score reaches 99, other police, and eventually SWAT will attempt to kill him. The number of Good or Bad Cop points also plays a factor in determining the game's ending.

Plot

Note: This plot synopsis details the "good ending"

The game begins with Detective Nick Kang (voiced by Russell Wong) being recruited into the autonomous Elite Operations Division of the LAPD at the behest of Chief Wanda Parks (CCH Pounder). Kang is the son of Henry Wilson, a detective whose disappearance twenty years previously has remained unsolved. He was recently suspended from the police department for repeated incidents of excessive force, but Parks believes he has what it takes to help the E.O.D. break a case involving a series of bombings in Chinatown. Kang's gut tells him the Triad is behind it. Parks partners him with Detective Rosie Velasco (Michelle Rodriguez), an ex-gangbanger turned cop.

Kang and Velasco head to a diner in Chinatown where they see a Triad member harassing the owner. During the ensuing confrontation, Velasco is shot and wounded. Parks puts out an APB on the Triad's getaway car, which is soon spotted at a Chinese bar. Kang heads there, learning the driver works for Jimmy Fu (Keone Young), a small-time criminal. Kang visits Fu, who tells him "something big is about to go down," and reveals he is working for "Big" Chong (Keone Young), an enforcer for Ancient Wu's Triad, which is thought by many to be a myth.

At the precinct, Sergeant George (Christopher Walken), an elderly desk sergeant, tells Velasco about Kang's background; his father, Henry Wilson, was involved in a drug trafficking scandal in the 1970s, during which he disappeared. Internal Affairs believed Wilson skipped town, but George never believed it. Meanwhile, Kang tails Chong and sees him bringing large amounts of money into a building owned by Cyprus Holdings, a company linked to the Russian mafia. Kang follows Chong to a spa, where he observes him meeting a Russian named "Rocky" (Gary Oldman). Rocky complains Chong is not laundering the money from Chinatown quickly enough. Chong tells Rocky that Ancient Wu is unhappy, but Rocky is unconcerned, telling Chong, "the General is in town looking for his money. That's bad news for all of us." Kang confronts them, killing Chong, but Rocky escapes.

Meanwhile, Parks introduces Kang to FBI Agent Paul Masterson (Gary Oldman). The FBI had the spa under surveillance in an effort to build a case against Rocky, but since Kang's raid, Rocky has disappeared. Kang sets out to find Rocky, and Parks fills Velasco in on more of his backstory. After Henry disappeared, Kang and his brother Cary Kang (Ryun Yu) moved to Hong Kong to live with their deceased mother's relatives. They changed their name to Kang, but both returned to L.A. eventually; Kang to become a cop, Cary to open a franchise of martial arts dojos. Meanwhile, Kang traces Rocky to a club, where he observes a Hollywood detective entering the building. Kang meets Rocky, who tells him the money the Triad is laundering is counterfeit. Rocky warns Kang that if he doesn't back off, Cary will be killed. Kang races to Cary's dojo, but Cary is nowhere to be found.

Kang confronts the Hollywood cop from the club. His name is Don Rafferty (Michael Madsen), and he is an old friend of Henry's. He warns Kang the case he is working on is over his head, but tells him where Rocky is holding Cary. Kang rescues Cary and decides to speak to Ancient Wu. In what may be a dream, Kang heads to a restaurant in Chinatown, where he discovers a network of secret tunnels under the streets. Fighting his way through a horde of zombies, he finds "Ancient" Wu (James Hong), who makes him undergo a series of tests, including fighting fire-demons and a dragon, before telling him that twenty years previously, the KGB sent one of their top agents to L.A. However, he soon lost loyalty to Russia, and turned to a life of crime in the United States. The agent was Rasputin "Rocky" Kuznetsov.

Believing Kang to have lost his mind, Masterson fires him and issues a warrant for his arrest. However, with Velasco's help, Kang tails Rafferty to a warehouse where he hears Rocky tell Rafferty that Kang must be killed. Rafferty protests that he never wanted Henry killed, and doesn't want his son to die as well. Kang attacks them, but both Rocky and Rafferty escape. Kang is then led into a trap at Santa Monica Airport by Rocky's girlfriend Jill (Grey Griffin). Rocky explains that in the 1970s, he and Rafferty were smuggling cocaine into L.A., but Henry found out. Rocky tried to pay him off, but he refused, so Rocky shot him and dumped his body in the ocean. Rafferty then planted evidence to make Henry look dirty. Rocky tries to kill Kang, but Rafferty intervenes, saving Kang's life at the cost of his own.

Rocky tries to escape, but Kang stops and kills him. Kang is then confronted by General Han Yu Kim (Mako) of the North Korean army, the mastermind behind the counterfeit/laundering scam. Rocky had betrayed Kim, electing to keep the money for himself rather than sending it back to North Korea. With Rocky now dead, the only person blocking Kim's plans to use the money for his army is Kang. They fight, and if Kim wins, he escapes before the police arrive. If Kang wins, Kim is defeated and Kang is finally able to put his father's disappearance behind him.

Development
The game was first announced on May 15, 2002, when Activision revealed Luxoflux were developing an "original action-racing game inspired by Hong Kong action films" for PlayStation 2, Xbox and GameCube. According to Larry Goldberg, executive vice president of Activision Worldwide Studios,

Activision stated the game combined the gameplay of beat 'em ups, third-person shooters, and vehicular combat games, and would include over twenty branching missions and multiple endings. They also revealed the game would recreate  of Los Angeles, and the player would be able to visit multiple L.A. landmarks. Although only 40% complete, True Crime was first shown at the 2002 E3 event in May, where it was slated for an April 2003 release. Activision emphasized the geographical accuracy of the game's Los Angeles, as well as the different styles of gameplay.

In December, Activision showed a 60% complete version of the game. To recreate the city, the developers used commercial satellite imaging, GPS technology and traditional photographs, with the in-game city stretching from the Hollywood Hills to Downtown to Santa Monica to Marina Del Rey. They also revealed details of the branching plot, with many levels having two or three opening cutscenes, depending on what the player has done in previous levels. They stressed it would be rare for the player to find a "Game Over" screen; usually a failed mission will simply lead to a later level by way of a different path than had the player completed the mission successfully. They also revealed the game would have three completely different endings, and that the player could play through the game multiple times, experiencing a different narrative and different levels every time. They also announced the game would feature roughly one-hundred randomly occurring crimes that the player has the option of solving whilst driving around the city. The "Good Cop/Bad Cop" system was also shown for the first time, although it was still in a rudimentary state of development. The casting of Russell Wong as protagonist Nick Kang and Gary Oldman as the game's main villain was also announced.

In April 2003, Activision announced the main cast of voice actors; as well as Russell Wong and Gary Oldman, the game would also feature Christopher Walken, C. C. H. Pounder, James Hong, Mako, Ron Perlman and Keone Young. Several days later, Michelle Rodriguez and Michael Madsen were also added to the cast.

The game was next shown at the 2003 E3 event in May. Although not a final build, both IGN and GameSpot were impressed. IGN's Sam Bishop wrote "it's clear that Luxoflux isn't trying to bust out a quick and dirty Grand Theft Auto clone." GameSpot's Jeff Gertsmann praised the integration of gameplay types, writing "The interesting part is how well all these game mechanics mesh together to form a mission-driven yet open-ended game." However, they also announced that over one-hundred landmarks in L.A. were featured in the game, in their exact geographical locations, such as the Los Angeles Convention Center and the Staples Center.

In the build-up to the release of the game, Activision announced True Crime would be ported to mobile by MFORMA. On October 22, they sent the final build of the game to gaming websites. Several days later they confirmed rumors that Snoop Dogg was an unlockable character, with his own mission and car. They also announced they had signed an exclusive licensing deal with PUMA; Kang would be wearing several pieces from PUMA's Fall 2003 catalogue. Barney Waters, marketing director for PUMA North America stated "Video gaming is a phenomenon with a diverse appeal. From the skate kids, to the hipsters and fashionistas, gaming is the common denominator to a widespread audience, and a distinctive medium for PUMA to utilize to interact with consumers."

Lawsuit
In late October 2003, two weeks prior to the game's scheduled release of November 4, novelist Robert Crais claimed that the game's protagonist, Nicholas Kang, was a direct copy of the protagonist of many of Crais' novels, Elvis Cole. Crais filed a lawsuit which claimed "True Crime is substantially similar to the Elvis Cole novels," and accused Activision of copying "protectable expressions." The suit sought for an injunction to prevent Activision from shipping the game, for  undisclosed monetary damages, and for the "destruction of all infringing works."

The lawsuit failed to prevent the scheduled release of the game, and on November 6, Crais dropped the complaint entirely. After reviewing Luxoflux's development materials for the game, Crais was satisfied that lead designer Peter Morawiec had not copied the character of Kang from that of Cole, but was in fact a fan of Crais and was paying homage to his work. Shortly thereafter, Crais released a statement on his official website in which he wrote,

PC port
The PC port of the game was first announced by Activision on January 29, 2004, although no details were given on who would be porting it, or when it was slated for release. The only solid information was that it would feature an online multiplayer component. More details were revealed on February 18. The game was being ported by LTI Gray Matter, and would feature five different online gaming modes; "Street Racing" (racing customizable cars), "Dojo Master" (fighting in teams or individually), "Battle Master" (same as Dojo Master but with weaponry), "The Beat" (four players compete to make the most arrests in a set time) and "Chase Mode" (one player plays as a criminal and tries to avoid being caught by the other players, who play as police). The port would also feature several new weapons, enhanced graphics, thirty additional songs not in the console versions, and PC-optimized controls.

In March, Activision announced the PC version would also feature character skins not found in the console versions, mainly characters from other Activision games; Pitfall: The Lost Expedition, Vampire: The Masquerade – Bloodlines, Call of Duty, and the Tony Hawk's and Tenchu franchises. Later in March, more details were announced about the game's new soundtrack. Thirty-two additional licensed tracks were being added, mainly rock tracks from artists such as Alice in Chains, Queensrÿche, Spineshank and Stone Sour. On April 14, Activision showcased an almost finalized build of the game at a gaming event in San Francisco. IGN's Dan Adams praised the superior graphics and PC-specific controls. The port went gold on May 3.

SoundtrackTrue Crime: Streets of LA: The Soundtrack was released on November 11, 2003 for Vybe Squad Ent. and Koch Records. The album was produced by Bigg Swoop, Battlecat, Damizza, DJ Quik, Warren G and King Tech.

Activision first revealed details about the game's soundtrack on September 2, 2003, when they announced the game would feature over fifty original tracks from artists such as Snoop Dogg, Westside Connection, E-40, Kam, Lil Eazy, Lil' ½ Dead, Bad Azz, Damizza, Jayo Felony, Bigg Swoop, as well as licensed tracks from artists such as Ice-T, The D.O.C. and N.E.R.D. Chris Archer, executive producer at Activision Worldwide Studios stated, "True Crime: Streets of LA represents the largest collection of original West Coast hip hop music ever assembled. The collision of the game's intense action with the pulse pounding sounds from the powerhouses of urban music will elevate video game soundtracks to a whole new standard." Bright Riley, CEO of Vybe Squad, stated "This album marks the first time that the entire west coast is joining forces to create some of the hottest flows L.A. has to offer." On October 15, Activision announced full details of the soundtrack, which would feature twenty tracks.

AllMusic's Heather Phares scored the soundtrack 3 out of 5, writing "True Crime is something of an achievement when it comes to gathering popular music in support of a video game." She concluded "It's not a perfect soundtrack, but True Crime is entertaining enough to please gaming and non-gaming rap fans alike." IGN's Spence D scored the soundtrack 7.5 out of 10, writing "Where The Streets of LA: The Soundtrack really succeeds is in the fact that the 20 track album features all new material written specifically for the game." He concluded "The most interesting thing is that for all intents and purposes the West Coast gangsta scene, musically speaking, has more or less run its course, succumbing to the bling and blitz of the Dirty South. But this album proves that it's still alive and well. Whatever your take on the gunz-n-thugs mentality may be, one thing can't be denied: the 20 tracks included here are rife with game, style, and serious funktafication."

The soundtrack peaked at No. 100 on the Top R&B/Hip-Hop Albums and No. 42 on the Independent Albums chart. The soundtrack was nominated for "Best Soundtrack From a Video Game" at MTV's 2004 Video Music Awards, losing to Tony Hawk's Underground.

ReceptionTrue Crime: Streets of LA received "generally favorable reviews." The PlayStation 2 version holds an aggregate score of 77 out of 100 on Metacritic, based on thirty-nine reviews; the Xbox version 77 out of 100, based on twenty-five reviews; the GameCube version 77 out of 100, based on twenty-nine reviews; and the PC version 68 out of 100, based on thirty-one reviews.

IGN's Aaron Boulding scored the console versions 9 out of 10, giving the game an "Editor's Choice" award. The GameCube version was also the runner-up in the November 2003 "GameCube Game of the Month" award, losing to Prince of Persia: The Sands of Time. Boulding wrote "the greatest strength of this Luxoflux game is the integration of story and layers of game design into one cohesive package." He praised the gameplay, especially the Good Cop/Bad Cop system and the upgrades system. He also praised the absence of loading screens. However, he wrote of the graphics, "there are far too many clipping issues that come up far too often to be ignored. Similarly, the camera ties into the clipping problems so that there will be times when the camera will float through and behind a wall or tree during a fight so that you can't see the action at all." He concluded "True Crime is an enjoyable game if you can clear your mind of Grand Theft Auto expectations [...] It's a lot of fun despite the burden of the camera system and other technical glitches. It doesn't, nor should it, replace Grand Theft Auto by any means. True Crime has enough good to counter the bad and stand on its own." Boulding and Tom McNamara scored the PC version 8 out of 10, writing "the multiplayer that many of us have been salivating for is almost disorientingly low-budget." They were also critical of the controls and graphics, concluding "the rich fighting component and the shooting and driving mechanics aren't translated well to the PC, with awkward controls, poor texture quality, and odd visual bugs. Plus, multiplayer, the hot magnet exclusive to the PC version, is decidedly half-baked."Game Informers Andrew Reiner scored the PlayStation 2 version 8.5 out of 10, writing "True Crime is the first game to come along and truly give the Grand Theft Auto series a run for its money." However, he also wrote "a number of roadblocks hold True Crime back from achieving greatness [...] The game has amazing variety. Unfortunately, none of these individual components feel particularly polished." Of the protagonist, he wrote "Nick Kang is quite easily the most annoying new character in video games." He concluded "It's not nearly as good as GTA, but entertaining nonetheless." Justin Leeper scored the GameCube version 8 out of 10, writing "this is the worst of the three console versions of this title. Fortunately, it's still pretty darn good." Of the graphics, he wrote "the replication of LA suffers from some of the worst pop-up I've seen in a game."

GameSpy's Russ Fischer scored the console versions 4 out of 5, writing "there's more to True Crime than GTA emulation." Of the graphics, he wrote, "the rendering of L.A. is superb -- simply put, there's not a better real-world model in gaming [...] The problem is with the camera, which has some real problems in tight quarters. There are also occasional clipping issues." He concluded "The problems can't tear down the fact that True Crime really does create its own identity." Joel Durham Jr. scored the PC version 3 out of 5, writing "while it manages to retain the overall appeal of the original, the complaints hold true, with a few new ones that cropped up along the way." He was critical of the controls, calling them "unresponsive and clunky." He was also critical of multiplayer mode; "Multiplayer True Crime is about as reliable as Pacific Gas and Electric." He concluded "the gameplay of True Crime is hampered by a host of negatives. It's a fun game, but it's hard to recommend to hardcore PC gamers -- you'll need a strong appreciation of console gaming to embrace it."

GameSpot's Jeff Gertsmann scored the console versions 7.2 out of 10, writing "the game's strong production values aren't backed up by an equally compelling story or game." He called Nicholas Kang "completely unlikeable" and "an unnecessarily cocky jerk." However, he also wrote, "in terms of its presentation, True Crime delivers quite well. The graphics are very sharp and are most impressive when you're out on the road. Los Angeles looks startlingly realistic, right down to the maze of freeway on- and off-ramps." He concluded "True Crime is a game that simply lacks polish and, in some cases, feels unfinished. It makes decent attempts with its different styles of gameplay, but none of them are particularly well done." He scored the PC version 6.3 out of 10, writing "the game's transition from console to PC wasn't handled as smoothly as you might have expected, thus leaving a game that was already a little uneven feeling a little broken in some spots." He called the controls "pretty terrible" and argued "the fact that the PC version doesn't have any sort of gamepad support certainly doesn't help." He was also critical of the graphics, writing "True Crime looks like a PlayStation 2 game that's been ported up, touched up a little bit, and shipped." He called the multiplayer mode "ill-conceived," arguing "the online mode actually detracts from the overall package rather than enhancing it."

Eurogamer's Tom Bramwell scored the PlayStation 2 version 7 out of 10, writing "although comparisons with GTA III and its multi-million-selling sequel are inevitable, True Crime actually does a good job of setting out its own stall." He was critical of the graphics, citing "low-resolution textures, some clipping issues, a rather horrible depth of field effect and a lack of screen-filling vistas." He called Nicholas Kang "one of the most unlikeable folks I've ever had the displeasure of thumbing around a third-person action game". However, he also wrote "The fact is that there's just something compelling about the game - and it's not any particular element over another - it's just something about the cohesiveness of the whole thing." He concluded "True Crime is this year's The Getaway - it's not GTA and it will frustrate for some on that basis, but it's a respectable enough game in its own right."Official U.S. PlayStation Magazines  John Davison scored the PlayStation 2 version 2 out of 5. He was highly critical of both the script and the storyline, and found the gameplay "boring." He wrote, "The overall experience starts off weak and deteriorates quickly. There's a fair amount of violence against women, which is disturbing." He concluded "This is a bad game. The fact that it was so ambitious just amplifies that fact. It's like a big-budget Hollywood flick gone horribly wrong."

Sales and awards
The game was a commercial success. During its first two weeks on release in North America, it sold over 300,000 units across all platforms. By the end of its first month, it had sold over 600,000 units. By July 2006, the PlayStation 2 version of True Crime had sold 1.5 million units and earned $65 million in the United States. Next Generation ranked it as the 27th highest-selling game launched for the PlayStation 2, Xbox or GameCube between January 2000 and July 2006 in that country. Combined sales of True Crime console games reached 2.8 million units in the United States by July 2006. In the United Kingdom, the PlayStation 2 version received a "Platinum" sales award from the Entertainment and Leisure Software Publishers Association (ELSPA), indicating sales of at least 300,000 units. Ultimately, the game went on to sell over 3 million units worldwide across all platforms.

At the 2003 Spike Video Game Awards, True Crime was nominated for five awards; "Best Action Game", "Best Animation", "Best Music", and two "Best Performance by a Human" nominations (Christopher Walken as George and Snoop Dogg as himself). It won Best Action Game, but lost in the other categories; Best Animation was given to Dead or Alive Xtreme Beach Volleyball, Best Music to Def Jam Vendetta and Best Performance by a Human to Ray Liotta in Grand Theft Auto: Vice City. It was also nominated for "Most Innovative Story Design - Interactive Media", and Snoop Dogg was nominated for "Outstanding Character from an Interactive Media" at the 2004 Satellite Awards. It lost in the first category to XIII. Snoop Dogg lost to Ray Liotta's performance in Vice City. It was also nominated for the "Technical Achievement" award at the 1st British Academy Games Awards in 2004, losing to EyeToy: Play''.

Notes

References

External links

2003 video games
Action-adventure games
Activision games
Aspyr games
Detective video games
Fictional portrayals of the Los Angeles Police Department
GameCube games
Luxoflux games
MacOS games
Mobile games
Multiplayer and single-player video games
Multiplayer online games
Neo-noir video games
Open-world video games
Organized crime video games
PlayStation 2 games
Third-person shooters
Video games scored by Sean Murray
Video games set in Los Angeles
Video games with alternate endings
Windows games
Xbox games
Video games about police officers
Video games with custom soundtrack support
Spike Video Game Award winners
Triad (organized crime)
Video games developed in the United States